The Latina Love Tour was the sixth concert tour by Mexican recording artist Thalía in support of her 2016 album Latina. This album had a huge commercial impact in all over Latin America and the United States. It was also Thalía's first tour in three years, following the 2013 The VIVA! Tour. The tour started in New Jersey on September 23, 2016 and concluded on October 18 at the National Auditorium in Mexico City.

Broadcast and recordings 

On October 10, 2016, Thalía announced through her social medias that she will release a documentary film about her Latina Love tour.

Set list 

{|class="collapsible collapsed" width="70%" style="background-color:#White; border-radius:10px;"
! style="background-color:#ccccff; font-size: 100%; border:; padding-left:5px; border-radius:7px" | United States
|-
|
"Video Intro" (contains elements from "Acción y Reacción", "Reencarnación", "Amor a la Mexicana", "Noches sin luna", and "El día del amor")
"Amor a la Mexicana"
"Te Perdiste Mi Amor"
"No No No"
"El Próximo Viernes"
"Gracias a Dios"
"Insensible"
"Más"
"En silencio" (Video Interlude)
"Por Lo Que Resta de Vida"
"¿Qué Será de Ti?"
"Equívocada"
"Habítame Siempre"
"Te encontrare" (Video Interlude)
"La Movidita"
"Todavia Te Quiero"
"De Ti"
"Medley" (Telenovelas)
"Rosalinda"
"Marimar"
"María la del Barrio"
"Frutas"
"Gracias" (Video Interlude)
"Entre El Mar y Una Estrella"
"Tiki tiki ta"
"Medley"
"Tú y Yo"
"No Me Enseñaste"
"Seducción"
"Piel Morena"
"Desde Esa Noche"
Encore
"¿A Quién Le Importa?"
"Arrasando"

Sources :
|}

{|class="collapsible collapsed" width="70%" style="background-color:#White; border-radius:10px;"
! style="background-color:#ccccff; font-size: 100%; border:; padding-left:5px; border-radius:7px" | Mexico
|-
|
"Video Intro" (contains elements from "Acción y Reacción", "Reencarnación", "Amor a la Mexicana", "Noches sin luna", and "El día del amor")
"Love"
"Medley" (Retro)
"Un Pacto entre los Dos"
"Amándote"
"En la Intimidad"
"Fuego cruzado"
"Sangre"
"Pienso en ti"
"Amarillo azul"
"Gracias a Dios"
"Insensible"
"Amore mio"
"Más"
"En silencio" (Video Interlude)
"Por Lo Que Resta de Vida"
"¿Qué Será de Ti?"
"Equívocada"
"Habítame Siempre"
"Te encontrare" (Video Interlude)
"Pena negra"
"La Movidita"
"Todavia Te Quiero"
"De Ti"
"Medley" (Telenovelas)
"Rosalinda"
"Marimar"
"María la del Barrio"
"Frutas"
"Gracias" (Video Interlude)
"Entre El Mar y Una Estrella"
"Tiki tiki ta"
"Medley"
"Tú y Yo"
"No Me Enseñaste"
"Seducción"
"Piel Morena"
"Amor a la mexicana" 
"Desde Esa Noche"
Encore
"¿A Quién Le Importa?"
"Arrasando"
|}

Tour dates

References

2016 concert tours
Concert tours of the United States
Concert tours of Mexico
Thalía